Richard Saul Wurman (born March 26, 1935) is an American architect and graphic designer. Wurman has written, designed, and published 90 books and created the TED conferences, the EG Conference, TEDMED, and the WWW Conference.

Education and honors
Wurman received both his B.Arch. and M.Arch. degrees from the University of Pennsylvania, completing his graduate degree with honors in 1959.

Career
Wurman chaired the IDCA Conference in 1972, the First Federal Design assembly in 1973, and the annual American Institute of Architects (AIA) conference in 1976. He created and chaired several conferences, including the TED conferences from 1984 through 2003, TEDMED from 1995 through 2010, and the WWW conference.

He works with Esri and RadicalMedia on comparative cartographic initiatives for mapping urban settings, which is planned to culminate in the creation of a network of live urban observatories around the world.

Wurman supports SENS Research Foundation, a nonprofit biotechnology organization that seeks to repair the damages of aging and extend healthy lifespan.

Publications
Wurman has written, designed, and published nearly a hundred books on varying topics, including Notebooks and Drawings of Louis I. Kahn (1963) and What Will Be Has Always Been (1986), a collection of words bt Louis Kahn. Wurman's map-oriented and infographic guidebooks include the Access travel series (starting with Access/LA in 1980), several books on healthcare, Understanding USA (1999). Information Anxiety (1989) and its second edition (2000).  His books about information architecture and information design include Information Architects (1996) and UnderstandingUnderstanding (2017).

Awards
He was awarded the Arthur Spayed Brooks Gold Medal, several honorary doctorates, a Graham fellowship, a Guggenheim fellowship, numerous federal National Endowment for the Arts grants, and has served as a distinguished professor at Northeastern University. He is a recipient of a Lifetime Achievement Award from Cooper Hewitt, Smithsonian Design Museum, an Annual Gold Medal from Trinity College, Dublin, a Gold Medal from AIGA, and Boston Science Museum's 50th Annual Bradford Washburn Award in 2014. He is also an American Institute of Architects fellow and member of the Art Directors Club of New York hall of fame.

Personal life
Wurman lives in Golden Beach, Florida with his wife, novelist Gloria Nagy. They have four children and six grandchildren. He is Jewish.

References

External links

 
 Richard Saul Wurman at TED

1936 births
AIGA medalists
American graphic designers
20th-century American Jews
American nonprofit businesspeople
Businesspeople from Pennsylvania
Businesspeople from Rhode Island
California State Polytechnic University, Pomona faculty
Impresarios
Information architects
Living people
National Design Award winners
Artists from Newport, Rhode Island
Architects from Philadelphia
TED (conference)
University of Pennsylvania School of Design alumni
21st-century American Jews